The Cleveland mayoral election of 1939 saw the reelection of the Republican Harold Hitz Burton to a third term as the Mayor of Cleveland over the Democratic John O'Donnell.

General election

References

Mayoral elections in Cleveland
Cleveland mayoral
Cleveland
November 1939 events
1930s in Cleveland